The normative principle of worship is a Christian theological principle that teaches that worship in the Church can include those elements that are not prohibited by Scripture. The normative principle teaches that whatever is not prohibited in Scripture is permitted in worship, as long as it is agreeable to the peace and unity of the Church. In short, there must be agreement with the general practice of the Church and no prohibition in Scripture for whatever is done in worship.

The normative principle is often contrasted with the regulative principle of worship, which teaches that only those practices or elements which are specifically commanded or modelled in Scripture are to be permitted in worship services.

Historically, the definition of the normative principle concerned replicating scriptural patterns, i.e. norms.  Dr. Peter Masters of the Metropolitan Tabernacle wrote an article on this subject  and explained that the historic distinction is different to the one above.  Historically, regulative meant simply obeying direct instructions, whereas normative meant not just the requirements of the regulative principle, but also replicating patterns established by the scriptures.  One example of this concerns congregationalist polity in respect of church government: - proponents of this polity point to the biblical norm of churches being individually autonomous.

See also
Regulative principle of worship

References

Further reading

Christian ethics
Christian worship and liturgy